Mire Aware Stadium is a stadium in Garowe, the administrative capital of the autonomous Puntland region in northeastern Somalia.

References

Sports venues in Somalia
Garowe